is a Japanese music executive producer.

He married Junko Utada (Keiko Fuji) and oversaw her career. They were married and divorced to each other seven times. Their only child is the singer Hikaru Utada, one of Japan's most successful pop music singers of all time.

Teruzane Utada was born in Yamaguchi Prefecture, Yamaguchi Tokuji town Fujiki. He fought in the Vietnam War. Depending on the producer, Utada also uses the names Sking U, Utada Sking Teruzane, and Utada Skingg Teruzane.

Musical works

Only lyrics

For Joe Hisaishi 
 1986: THE WINTER REQUIEM (album: CURVED MUSIC)
 1986: A RAINBOW IN CURVED MUSIC (album: CURVED MUSIC)
 1989: MEET ME TONIGHT (album: PRETENDER)
 1989: TRUE SOMEBODY (album: PRETENDER)
 1989: WONDER CITY (album: PRETENDER)
 1989: ALL DAY PRETENDER (album: PRETENDER)
Composer: Joe Hisaishi

For J-WALK (now named "THE JAYWALK") 
 1987: YOU MAKE ME FEEL SO ALIVE (album: Owari no nai natsu)
 1987: BELIEVE ME (album: Owari no nai natsu)
Composer: Izumi Tsunehiro

Only composer

For U3 
 1993: STAR (album: STAR)
 1993: Ikirukoto o oshiete kureta (album: STAR)
Co-writer by SKING U & RA U.

For Keiko Fuji 
 1994: Sake ni you hodo (single: Sake ni you hodo)
 1997: Otome (single: Otome)
 1997: Daite... (single: Otome)
Co-writer by SKING U & RA U

Singer

U3 
 1993: Umareta toki kara I Love You (album: STAR)
 1993: New York Serenade (album: STAR)
Co-writer by SKING U & RA U

Keiko Fuji with Cubic U 
 1996: Tsumetai tsuki 〜 nakanaide 〜 (single: Tsumetai tsuki 〜 nakanaide 〜)
 1996: Golden Era (single: Tsumetai tsuki 〜 nakanaide 〜)
Co-writer by SKING U & RA U

References

1948 births
Japanese male composers
Japanese record producers
Living people
Musicians from Yamaguchi Prefecture
Hikaru Utada